Miss International Queen is the world's biggest beauty pageant for transgender women. The pageant was conceived in 2004 and named the largest and most prestigious by CNN original American documentary television series This Is Life with Lisa Ling aired on 26 November 2017.

The pageant is a registered trademark of Thailand's company – Tiffany's Show Pattaya Co, Ltd. It is held annually in Pattaya City, Thailand since 2004. The mission of the pageant aims towards LGBTQ and Transgender awareness and equality in both society and workforce, while all the monetary profits of the actual televised show goes to the Royal Charity AIDS Foundation of Thailand.

The reigning Miss International Queen is Fuschia Anne Ravena from the Philippines, who was crowned on 25 June 2022.

History 
The Miss International Queen official website states that the beauty pageant was established with the intent to, "offer an international competition for transgender women from around the world and to provide an opportunity for transgender women to be more accepted in today's world, to create transgender rights awareness among international communities and to build friendship and exchange ideas among international lesbian, gay, bisexual and transgender/transsexual communities."

Pageant requirements
The contestants must have been born male, can be pre- or post-operation and between the ages of 18 to 35. In addition, participants can only represent their country of birth or that listed in their passport and must not have previously joined any publication/website/adult film/prostitution showcasing nudity. Previous winners or runner-up contestants are not allowed to join again. Repeat non-placement candidates are allowed to re-submit their credentials and application.

Only about 25 semi-final contestants chosen would go on to compete in the final round and are required to participate in two weeks of activities: photo shoots, luncheons with city officials, dinner with the press, sponsor visits and community outreach, similar conditions to competitors in other beauty pageants. The final show will be aired on Thai television as well as live online streaming.

Crown design and prize
In 2011, the crown for Miss International Queen Crown was re-designed by an inspiration of butterflies and the crown of Lady Liberty. The butterflies were intended to symbolize beauty found in nature and the idea of rebirth. The crown remains with the Miss International Queen Organization at an estimated value of US$10,000. The Miss International Queen winner receives cash prize of 450,000 Thai baht (about US$15,000), many sponsor gifts, an apartment at Woodlands Resort Pattaya during her reign and memories that last a lifetime.

Charity trademarks
Miss International Queen is a registered trademark and a non-profit sector of the organizer Tiffany's Show Pattaya Co., Ltd., world's largest transgender cabaret show since 1974 and sponsored by Tourism Authority of Thailand. All the monetary profits of the final televised show goes to the Royal Charity AIDS Foundation of Thailand.

Transgender inclusion in pageants 
According to recent studies, transgender individuals are often the victims of social and political discrimination. The Miss International Queen pageant offers contestants the opportunity to compete and showcase their talent and beauty in an LGBTQ friendly environment.

Transgender pageant cases 
Recent events have drawn attention to the treatment of transgender pageant contestants and how their personal identification impacts their eligibility. There have been instances where transgender and transsexual pageant winners have lost their title for not being "transgender enough". On the other hand, certain participants have also been disqualified from cisgender female pageants for not being a "natural born female". In 2012, Jenna Talackova who participated in Miss International Queen in 2010 was disqualified from Miss Universe Canada on the basis of competing as a woman when she was born a male. Supporters of Talackova argue that there were no rules explicitly banning transsexuals from competing. Talackova joined in the 2010 Miss International Queen competition. This instance sparked a debate as to how Talackova's gender identification affected her eligibility to compete in both competitions. Talackova argued that if she was transgender, she could participate in transgender pageants. At the same time, if she identified as a woman, she would have had the right to participate fairly in the Miss Universe Canada competition.  Jenna Talackova's case is one that brings awareness to the public perception and personal opinions pertaining to transgenders competing in pageants.

A similar case occurred later in 2016 when the winner of the Miss Transgender UK, Jai Dara Latto, was stripped of her title after pageant organizers claimed she was not living "full time" as a woman. This was after footage was uncovered of Latto walking around in boxers rather than female undergarments. Latto was pegged as a "drag queen" rather than a transgender woman and proceeded to forfeit her pageant title and earnings. Latto pledged to walk thirty miles in high heels in honor of transgender rights after the allegations.

Both Talackova and Latto's cases raise the question as to who is eligible to win a cisgender pageant and also what qualifications or standards must be met in order for a transgender pageant winner to retain her title. Participants are eligible to compete and win the title of Miss International Queen if they were born male and their sexual or gender identification is that of a female. These recent events have sparked a debate involving the social inclusion and equality that is associated with an individual's sexual and gender identification.

Public perception of transgender beauty pageants 
General attitudes towards pageants like Miss International Queen vary among members of the population. Studies have suggested that some people are in favor of transgender inclusion in beauty pageants, while others argue that it is only fair that they compete in pageants that are exclusively for transgender contestants. Although the premise of pageants has varying opinions as well, competitions like Miss International Queen offer the same opportunity to transgender women that individuals who were born female and identify as one have. Recent publications and studies claim that beauty pageants have negative impacts, while other sources suggest that pageants portray the intersectionality and dynamics of gender politics, sexual orientation, and cultural stigmas.

Kathoeys and inclusion 
Thailand is well known for its high rates of sex tourism, especially in Pattaya. Miss International Queen pageant and its organization is aiming to show the transgender women that there are alternative career choices. Kathoey typically refers to a transgender woman or a very feminine acting male. A kathoey is often called a ladyboy in the English language. Although Thailand is much more accepting of transgender people than most other countries, the LQBTQ+ community remains stigmatized. Cultural norms still suggest that someone's hobbies, mannerisms, and interests should match one's gender. So, even though kathoeys are accepted in society, a cisgender male working a typically female job is still looked down upon. But, in October 1997, Thailand released a constitution that called for equal rights and treatment for all people, regardless of race, sex, gender, and more. Therefore, Thai culture slowly started to accept all individuals.

Sex reassignment surgery 
Trans culture is very prevalent in Thailand due to extensive medical research done and sex-change surgeries. The first documented sex change in Thailand was in 1975, and attitudes and surgical techniques have improved much since then. On 25 November 2009, the Thailand Medical Council released a policy that was titled "Criteria for the treatment of sex change, Census 2009". Since this policy change, ninety percent of those who received a sex change operation are foreigners to Thailand. With this much tourism based solely off of sex reassignment surgery, Thailand's transgender community has not only grown, but trans individuals in Thai society are accepted on a much larger scale and will continue to be so in the future if the trend continues.

Self-esteem 
Transgender beauty pageants like Miss International Queen celebrate the contestants and promote awareness of the transgender community. Studies have shown that competing in prestigious beauty pageants are linked to higher levels of self-esteem. These higher levels of self-esteem can stem from a stronger sense of identity experienced after competing against other transgender women. However, finishing as winners or runners-up in the beauty pageants did not further increase levels of self-esteem and confidence. Instead, simply increasing the number of competitions were found to be much more effective in raising self-esteem. This information shows that the result of the beauty pageant is less important in terms of self-esteem than participation in the beauty pageant itself.

Fair competition in female pageants 
Transgender-only beauty pageants provide a way for transgender women to fairly compete against one another. Inclusion of transgender women in all-female beauty pageants like Miss Universe is not only less common, but raise questions about fairness of competition. One viewpoint argues that though it is politically correct to include transgender women in beauty pageants, it does not promote the spirit of a fair competition. An analogy given for this theory is through the sex segregation of sports based on physical differences. As most female track and field sprinters cannot run faster than male track and field sprinters because of physiological differences, transgender women cannot always portray the feminine beauty norms that judges in popular beauty pageants critique contestants on. For example, some transgender women cannot achieve the certain look that comes from the wider hips that women tend to have. However, the theory acknowledges that it is difficult to determine which physical inequalities are actually relevant in judging feminine beauty and creating a fair competition. With transgender-only beauty pageants, these inequalities are gone and a platform for equal competition can be established.

Judgment in pageants 
Miss International Queen is owned by Tiffany's Show of Pattaya City, Thailand. Its Thai contestants qualify for the competition by winning the title of Miss Tiffany's Universe which also owned by Tiffany's Show Pattaya Co. Ltd. There has been controversy over the look and race of the winners of each year. Over its entirety, an African diaspora trans woman won the crown for the first time in 2019.

Beauty pageants and politics 
Studies show that participating in beauty pageants can aid in achieving political office. In the United States, a significant 12 percent of all female governors competed in beauty pageants. Many of the same skills required to compete and do well in beauty pageants apply to politics as well. Some of these overlapping skills include public speaking, poise under pressure, and solicitation of funds. Pageant winners are often viewed as representatives of their hometown, state, or country. This experience in representing one's hometown in beauty pageants have been shown to translate over to prowess in political representation as well.

The number of transgender politicians and beauty pageants are relatively low when compared to their cisgender counterparts. However, beauty pageants can still serve as a way for transgenders to attain political office because the same dynamics of cisgender beauty pageants are present in transgender pageants. Transgender beauty pageants like Miss International Queen not only bring fame and name recognition to its winners, but provide a platform to bring awareness to transgender politics. Transgender beauty pageants represent a springboard to future opportunities for many transgender individuals.

Titleholders 
No pageant held in 2008 , 2017  and 2021.

Gallery of winners

By number of wins

List of Runners-up

List of special awards winners 
 Miss Popular Vote (2021 – present), Most Popular Introductory Video (2015 – 2020), Miss Ripley's Popular Vote (2006 – 2015)
 Best in Talent (2005 – 2011, 2013 – present), Best Kiss Talent (2012)
 Miss Congeniality (2004 – 2014, 2018 – present), Miss Friendly Air Asia (2015 – 2017)

List of Contestants

2015–present

2004–2014

List of Miss International Queen countries

Notes

See also 

 List of beauty contests
 Miss Trans Star International
 Miss T World

References

External links
 

Transgender beauty pageants
 
2004 establishments in Thailand
Beauty pageants in Thailand
LGBT events in Thailand
Events in Pattaya
Recurring events established in 2004